Biltmore may refer to:

Related to the Vanderbilt mansion in North Carolina
 Biltmore Forest, North Carolina, a town in Buncombe County
 Biltmore Village, a village now within Asheville
 The Biltmore Estate, in Biltmore Forest, near Asheville
 The Biltmore Company, owner of the above estate
 Biltmore Farms, dairy farm and real estate company split off from the above estate
 Biltmore Forest School, on the above estate
 Biltmore Beacon, a weekly newspaper in  Asheville

Historic buildings in Biltmore Village
 Biltmore Estate Office, a historic office building
 Biltmore Hospital, a historic hospital building
 Biltmore Hardware Building, a historic commercial building
 Biltmore Shoe Store, a historic commercial building
 Biltmore Village Cottage District, a national historic district
 Biltmore Village Cottages, two historic homes formerly located at Biltmore Village
 Biltmore Village Commercial Buildings, a set of two historic commercial buildings

Places
 Biltmore Area, an area of Phoenix, Arizona
 Biltmore Fashion Park, a luxury outdoor retail and dining plaza in the Biltmore Area, Phoenix
 Biltmore Apartments, a building complex located in Portland, Oregon listed on the National Register of Historic Places
 Biltmore, Tennessee, a census-designated place

Brands and enterprises
 Biltmore Hotel, a name for many of the Bowman-Biltmore Hotels
Arizona Biltmore Hotel, in Phoenix, Arizona
Millennium Biltmore Hotel, in Los Angeles, California
Santa Barbara Biltmore, in Santa Barbara, California
Belleview Biltmore, in Belleair, Florida
Miami Biltmore, in Coral Gables, Florida
Atlanta Biltmore Hotel, in Atlanta, Georgia
New York Biltmore Hotel, in New York, New York
Westchester Biltmore Country Club, in Harrison, New York
Dayton Biltmore Hotel, in Dayton, Ohio
Providence Biltmore, Providence, Rhode Island
Sevilla Biltmore, in Havana, Cuba
 Biltmore Records, a record label
 Biltmore Theatre, in New York City, now known as the Samuel J. Friedman Theatre

Other
 Biltmore College, a prior name of the University of North Carolina at Asheville
 Biltmore Conference, of Zionist leaders in 1942
 Guelph Biltmore Mad Hatters, a junior ice hockey team in Ontario
 Biltmore Hat Company, a haberdashery and sponsor of the Guelph Biltmore Mad Hatters
 Biltmore stick, a tool used to measure various tree dimensions